The Cixerri is an Italian river in southern Sardinia province of Cagliari. The river flows into a lake north of Iglesias and then exits the lake and flows eastward. The river is joined by a tributary north of Villamassargia and south of Musei before entering the province of Cagliari. The river flows past Siliqua and is joined by another tributary from the south. Finally, the river enters the Stagno di Cagliari close to the mouth of the Flumini Mannu near Assemini.

References

Rivers of Italy
Rivers of Sardinia
Rivers of the Province of South Sardinia
Rivers of the Province of Cagliari
Drainage basins of the Tyrrhenian Sea